This is a list of mammals in New Mexico. It includes mammals extirpated from New Mexico and species introduced into the state. A total of 169 mammals are listed.

Opossums (order: Didelphimorphia) 
Family: Didelphidae
 Virginia opossum, Didelphis virginiana

Armadillos (order: Cingulata) 

Family: Dasypodidae
 Nine-banded armadillo, Dasypus novemcinctus

Shrews (order: Eulipotyphla) 

Family: Soricidae
 North American least shrew, Cryptotis parva
 Crawford's gray shrew, Notiosorex crawfordi
 Arizona shrew, Sorex arizonae
 Cinereus shrew, Sorex cinereus
 Merriam's shrew, Sorex merriami
 Montane shrew, Sorex monticolus
 New Mexico shrew, Sorex neomexicanus
 American water shrew, Sorex palustris
 Preble's shrew, Sorex preblei

Bats (order: Chiroptera) 

Family: Molossidae
 Western mastiff bat, Eumops perotis
 Pocketed free-tailed bat, Nyctinomops femorosaccus 
 Big free-tailed bat, Nyctinomops macrotis 
 Mexican free-tailed bat, Tadarida brasiliensis
Family: Phyllostomidae
 Mexican long-tongued bat, Choeronycteris mexicana 
 Greater long-nosed bat, Leptonycteris nivalis

Family: Vespertilionidae
 Hoary bat, Aeorestes cinereus
 Pallid bat, Antrozous pallidus 
 Townsend's big-eared bat, Corynorhinus townsendii 
 Big brown bat, Eptesicus fuscus
 Spotted bat, Euderma maculatum 
 Allen's big-eared bat, Idionycteris phyllotis
 Silver-haired bat, Lasionycteris noctivagans
 Western red bat, Lasiurus blossevillii
 Eastern red bat, Lasiurus borealis
 Western yellow bat, Lasiurus xanthinus
 Southwestern myotis, Myotis auriculus
 California myotis, Myotis californicus
 Western small-footed myotis, Myotis ciliolabrum
 Long-eared myotis, Myotis evotis
 Little brown bat, Myotis lucifugus
 Arizona myotis, Myotis occultus
 Fringed myotis, Myotis thysanodes
 Long-legged myotis, Myotis yumanensis
 Western pipistrelle, Pipistrellus hersperus
 Eastern pipistrelle, Pipistrellus subflavus

Lagomorphs (order: Lagomorpha) 

Family: Leporidae
 Snowshoe hare, Lepus americanus
 Black-tailed jackrabbit, Lepus californicus 
 White-sided jackrabbit, Lepus callotis
 White-tailed jackrabbit, Lepus townsendii
 Desert cottontail, Sylvilagus audubonii 
 Eastern cottontail, Sylvilagus floridanus
 Robust cottontail, Sylvilagus holzneri
 Mountain cottontail, Sylvilagus nuttallii 
Family: Ochotonidae
 American pika, Ochotona princeps

Rodents (order: Rodentia)

Family: Castoridae
 American beaver, Castor canadensis

Family: Geomyidae
 Yellow-faced pocket gopher, Cratogeomys castanops
 Desert pocket gopher, Geomys arenarius
 Plains pocket gopher, Geomys bursarius
 Knox Jones's pocket gopher, Geomys knoxjonesi
 Botta's pocket gopher, Thomomys bottae
 Northern pocket gopher, Thomomys talpoides
 Southern pocket gopher, Thomomys umbrinus

Family: Heteromyidae
 Bailey's pocket mouse, Chaetodipus balieyi
 Chihuahuan pocket mouse, Chaetodipus eremicus
 Hispid pocket mouse, Chaetodipus hispidus
 Rock pocket mouse, Chaetodipus intermedius
 Nelson's pocket mouse, Chaetodipus nelsoni
 Desert pocket mouse, Chaetodipus penicillatus
 Merriam's kangaroo rat, Dipodomys merriamii
 Ord's kangaroo rat, Dipodomys ordii
 Banner-tailed kangaroo rat, Dipodomys spectabilis
 Plains pocket mouse, Perognathus flavescens
 Silky pocket mouse, Perognathus flavus
 Merriam's pocket mouse, Perognathus merriami

Family: Cricetidae
 Northern pygmy mouse, Baiomys taylori
 Long-tailed vole, Microtus longicadus
 Mogollon vole, Microtus mogollonenis
 Montane vole, Microtus montanus
 Prairie vole, Microtus ochrogaster
 Meadow vole, Microtus pennsylvanicus
 Southern red-backed vole, Myodes gapperi
 White-throated woodrat, Neotoma albigula
 Bushy-tailed woodrat, Neotoma cinerea
 White-toothed woodrat, Neotoma leucodon
 Mexican woodrat, Neotoma mexicana
 Southern plains woodrat, Neotoma micropus 
 Stephen's woodrat, Neotoma stephensi
 Common muskrat, Ondatra zibethicus
 Chihuahuan grasshopper mouse, Onychomys arenicola
 Northern grasshopper mouse, Onychomys leucogaster
 Southern grasshopper mouse, Onychomys torridus
 Brush deermouse, Peromyscus boylii
 Canyon deermouse, Peromyscus crinitus
 Cactus deermouse, Peromyscus eremicus
Southern deermouse, Peromyscus labecula
 White-footed mouse, Peromyscus leucopus
 Northern rock mouse, Peromyscus nasutus
 White-ankled mouse, Peromyscus pectoralis
Western deermouse, Peromyscus sonoriensis
 Pinyon mouse, Peromyscus truei
 Western heather vole, Phenacomys intermedius
 Fulvous harvest mouse, Reithrodontomys fulvescens
 Western harvest mouse, Reithrodontomys megalotis
 Plains harvest mouse, Reithrodontomys montanus
 Arizona cotton rat, Sigmodon arizonae
 Tawny-bellied cotton rat, Sigmodon fulviventer
 Hispid cotton rat, Sigmodon hispidus
 Yellow-nosed cotton rat, Sigmodon ochrognathus

Family: Muridae
 House mouse, Mus musculus introduced
 Norway rat, Rattus norvegicus introduced
 Black rat, Rattus rattus introduced

Family: Dipodidae
 Meadow jumping mouse, Zapus hudsonicus
 Western jumping mouse, Zapus princeps

Family: Erethizontidae
 North American porcupine, Erethizon dorsatum

Family: Echimyidae
 Coypu, Myocastor coypus introduced

Family: Sciuridae
 Harris's antelope squirrel, Ammospermophilus harrisii
 Texas antelope squirrel, Ammospermophilus interpres
 White-tailed antelope squirrel, Ammospermophilus leucurus
Golden-mantled ground squirrel, Callospermophilus lateralis
 Gunnison's prairie dog, Cynomys gunnisoni
 Black-tailed prairie dog, Cynomys ludovicianus
Mexican ground squirrel, Ictidomys mexicanus
 Thirteen-lined ground squirrel, Ictidomys tridecimlineatus
 Yellow-bellied marmot, Marmota flaviventris
 Gray-footed chipmunk, Neotamias canipes
 Gray-collared chipmunk, Neotamias cinereicollis
 Cliff chipmunk, Neotamias dorsalis
 Least chipmunk, Neotamias minimus
 Colorado chipmunk, Neotamias quadrivittatus
 Rock squirrel, Otospermophilus variegatus
 Abert's squirrel, Sciurus aberti
 Arizona gray squirrel, Sciurus arizonensis
 Fox squirrel, Sciurus niger
 Southwestern red squirrel, Tamiasciurus fremonti
 Spotted ground squirrel, Xerospermophilus spilosoma

Carnivorans (order: Carnivora)

Family: Canidae
 Coyote, Canis latrans
 Gray wolf, Canis lupus reintroduced
 Mexican wolf, C. l. baileyi reintroduced
 Mogollon mountain wolf, C. l. mogollonensis extinct
 Texas wolf, C. l. monstrabilis extinct
 Great Plains wolf, C. l. nubilus extinct
 Southern Rocky Mountain wolf, C. l. youngi extinct
 Gray fox, Urocyon cinereoargenteus 
 Kit fox, Vulpes macrotis
 Swift fox, Vulpes velox
 Red fox, Vulpes vulpes

Family: Ursidae
 American black bear, Ursus americanus 
 Brown bear, Ursus arctos extirpated
Grizzly bear, U. a. horribilis extirpated
Mexican grizzly bear, U. a. horribilis extinct

Family: Procyonidae
 Ring-tailed cat, Bassariscus astutus
 White-nosed coati, Nasua narica
 Raccoon, Procyon lotor

Family: Mephitidae
 American hog-nosed skunk, Conepatus leuconotus
 Hooded skunk, Mephitis macroura
 Striped skunk, Mephitis mephitis 
 Western spotted skunk, Spilogale gracilis

Family: Felidae
 Canada lynx, Lynx canadensis
 Bobcat, Lynx rufus 
 Jaguar, Panthera onca vagrant
 Cougar, Puma concolor

Family: Mustelidae
 Wolverine, Gulo gulo extirpated
 North American river otter, Lontra canadensis reintroduced 
 Pacific marten, Martes caurina
 Black-footed ferret, Mustela nigripes reintroduced
American ermine, Mustela richardsonii 
 Long-tailed weasel, Neogale frenata
 American mink, Neogale vison
 American badger, Taxidea taxus

Even-toed ungulates (order: Artiodactyla)

Family: Antilocapridae
 Pronghorn, Antilocapra americana

Family: Bovidae
 Barbary sheep, Ammotragus lervia introduced
 American bison, Bison bison reintroduced
Plains bison, B. b. bison reintroduced
 Wild goat, Capra aegagrus introduced
 Siberian ibex, Capra sibirica introduced
 Himalayan tahr, Hemitagus jemlahicus introduced
 Gemsbok, Oryx gazella introduced
 Bighorn sheep, Ovis canadensis 
Desert bighorn sheep, O. c. nelsoni

Family: Cervidae
 Moose, Alces alces vagrant
 Elk, Cervus canadensis reintroduced
Merriam's elk, C. c. merriami extinct
Rocky Mountain elk, C. c. nelsoni introduced
 Mule deer, Odocoileus hemionus
Desert mule deer, O. h. eremicus
Rocky Mountain mule deer, O. h. hemionus
 White-tailed deer, Odocoileus virginianius
Coues' deer, O. v. couesi

Family: Suidae
 Wild boar, Sus scrofa introduced

Family: Tayassuidae
 Collared peccary, Dicotyles tajacu

References

Mammals
New Mexico
mammals